Richard James Edwards (born 22 December 1967 – disappeared 1 February 1995), also known as Richey James or Richey Manic, was a Welsh musician who was the lyricist and rhythm guitarist of the alternative rock band Manic Street Preachers. He was known for his dark, politicised and intellectual songwriting which, combined with an enigmatic and eloquent character, has assured him cult status. He has been cited as a leading lyricist of his generation, leading the Cool Cymru movement.

Edwards disappeared on 1 February 1995. On 24 November 2008, he was declared presumed dead "on or since" 1 February 1995. The ninth Manic Street Preachers album, Journal for Plague Lovers, released on 18 May 2009, is composed entirely of songs with lyrics left by Edwards.  the remaining members of Manic Street Preachers were still paying 25% royalties into an account in his name.

Biography
Richard James Edwards was born and raised in Blackwood, Wales to Graham and Sherry Edwards. He had one younger sister, Rachel (born 1969), with whom he was close. Edwards attended Oakdale Comprehensive School. From 1986 to 1989, he attended University of Wales, Swansea and graduated with a 2:1 degree in political history. The Edwards family lived in Blackwood. He met Nicky Wire, Sean Moore and James Dean Bradfield at Oakdale Comprehensive School.

Career
Edwards was initially a driver and roadie for Manic Street Preachers. He was accepted as the band's main spokesman and fourth member in 1989. Edwards showed little musical talent; his real contribution to the band was in their lyrics and design. He frequently mimed playing the guitar during early live performances and accordingly only played on two songs during the Manic Street Preachers studio career, but was, along with bassist Nicky Wire, principal lyricist. Edwards is said to have written approximately 80% of the lyrics on their third album, The Holy Bible. Both are credited on all songs written before Edwards' disappearance, with Edwards receiving sole credit on three tracks from the 1996 album Everything Must Go, and co-writing credits on another two.

Despite Edwards' lack of musical input, he contributed to their overall musical direction, and according to the rest of the band on the Everything Must Go DVD, he played a leading role in deciding the band's sound. Edwards expressed a desire to create a concept album described as "Pantera meets Nine Inch Nails meets Screamadelica". Lead guitarist and vocalist James Dean Bradfield later expressed doubt over whether the band would have produced such an album: "I was worried that as chief tune-smith in the band I wasn't actually going to be able to write things that he would have liked. There would have been an impasse in the band for the first time born out of taste."

Edwards had severe depression, and was open about it in interviews. He self-harmed, mainly through stubbing cigarettes on his arms and cutting himself: "When I cut myself I feel so much better. All the little things that might have been annoying me suddenly seem so trivial because I'm concentrating on the pain. I'm not a person who can scream and shout so this is my only outlet. It's all done very logically."  On 15 May 1991, after a gig at the Norwich Arts Centre, NME journalist Steve Lamacq questioned how serious Edwards was about his art; Edwards responded by carving the words "4 Real" into his forearm with a razor blade. The injury required eighteen stitches.

He had insomnia and used alcohol to help himself sleep at night. Before the release of The Holy Bible in 1994, he checked into Whitchurch Hospital and later the Priory hospital, missing out on some of the promotional work for the album and forcing the band to appear as a three piece at the Reading Festival and T in the Park. Following his release from the Priory in September, Manic Street Preachers toured Europe with Suede and Therapy? for what would be the last time. Edwards' final live appearance was at the London Astoria, on 21 December 1994. The concert ended with the band smashing their equipment and damaging the lighting system, prompted by Edwards' violent destruction of his guitar towards the end of set closer "You Love Us". On 23 January 1995, Edwards gave his last interview to Japanese music magazine Music Life.

Disappearance
Edwards disappeared on 1 February 1995, on the day when he and Bradfield were due to fly to the United States on a promotional tour of The Holy Bible. In the two weeks before his disappearance, Edwards withdrew £200 a day from his bank account, which totalled £2,800 by the day of the scheduled flight. It is not known if he intended to spend the cash during the U.S. tour or whether a part of it was to pay for a desk that he had ordered from a shop in Cardiff. There is no record of the desk having been paid for.

According to Emma Forrest, as quoted in A Version of Reason, "The night before he disappeared Edwards gave a friend a book called Novel with Cocaine, instructing her to read the introduction, which details the author staying in a mental asylum before vanishing." Whilst staying at the Embassy Hotel in Bayswater Road, London, according to Rob Jovanovic's biography, Edwards removed some books and videos from his bag. Among them was a copy of the play Equus. Edwards placed them in a box with a note that said "I love you", wrapped the box like a birthday present and decorated it with collages and literary quotations including a picture of a Germanic-looking house and Bugs Bunny. The package was addressed to Edwards' on/off girlfriend, Jo, whom he met some years prior, although they had split a few weeks earlier.

Edwards' sister, Rachel,  contributing to an article about Edwards' final lyrics by Guy Mankowski, proposed that Sylvia Plath's poem 'Tulips' 'summed up everything he [Edwards] thought at the time he went'. She added, 'why do I know this? Because he told me, he kept a copy of it, and he asked for it to be read at its funeral'. Rachel Edwards said, 'his thoughts must have been dominated by this poem–the themes and messages.'  The poem is generally considered to depict the tension between the speaker's desire for the simplicity of death and the tulip's encouragement towards life.

The next morning, Edwards collected his wallet, car keys, some Prozac and his passport. He reportedly checked out of the hotel at 7:00 a.m., leaving his toiletries, packed suitcase, and some of his Prozac. He then drove to his flat in Cardiff, leaving behind his passport, his Prozac and the Severn Bridge tollbooth receipt. In the two weeks that followed, Edwards was apparently spotted in the Newport passport office and at Newport bus station by a fan who was unaware that he was missing. The fan was reported to have discussed a mutual friend, Lori Fidler, before Edwards departed.

On 7 February, a taxi driver from Newport supposedly picked up Edwards from the King's Hotel, and drove him around the valleys, including Edwards' hometown of Blackwood. The driver reported that the passenger had spoken in a Cockney accent, which occasionally slipped into a Welsh one, and that he had asked if he could lie down on the back seat. Eventually they reached Blackwood and the bus station, but the passenger reportedly said "this is not the place", and asked to be taken to Pontypool railway station. It was later ascertained, according to Jovanovic's account, that Pontypool did not have a telephone. The passenger got out at the Severn View service station near Aust, South Gloucestershire and paid the £68 fare in cash.

On 14 February, Edwards' Vauxhall Cavalier received a parking ticket at the Severn View service station, and on 17 February, the vehicle was reported as abandoned. Police discovered the battery to be dead, with evidence that the car had been lived in. The car also had photos he had taken of his family days prior. Due to the service station's proximity to the Severn Bridge, a known suicide site, it was widely believed that Edwards had jumped from the bridge. Many people who knew Edwards, however, have said that he was never the type to contemplate suicide and he himself was quoted in 1994 as saying, "In terms of the 'S' word, that does not enter my mind. And it never has done, in terms of an attempt. Because I am stronger than that. I might be a weak person, but I can take pain".

Since then, Edwards has reportedly been spotted in a market in Goa, India, and on the islands of Fuerteventura and Lanzarote. There have been other alleged sightings of Edwards, especially in the years immediately following his disappearance. However, none of these has proved conclusive, and none has been confirmed by investigators. In 2018, it was revealed that the bridge's toll receipt was timestamped with a 24-hour clock, meaning he would have crossed the bridge at 2:55am, rather than 2:55pm as previously thought for 23 years.

The investigation itself has received criticism. In his 1999 book Everything (A Book About Manic Street Preachers), Simon Price states that aspects of the investigation were "far from satisfactory". He asserts the police may not have taken Edwards' mental state into account when prioritising his disappearance, and also records Edwards' sister Rachel as having "hit out at police handling" after CCTV footage was analysed two years after Edwards vanished. Price records a member of the investigation team as stating "that the idea that you could identify somebody from that is arrant nonsense". While his family had the option of declaring him legally dead from 2002 onwards, they chose not to for many years, and his status remained open as a missing person until 23 November 2008, when he became officially "presumed dead".

Legacy
Edwards' disappearance attracted a great deal of media attention.

On 8 April 1995, an issue of Melody Maker – released in conjunction with the Samaritans regarding depression, self-harm and suicide. The magazine had received a number of letters from fans distressed at both the anniversary of the death of Kurt Cobain and the disappearance of Edwards. The 8 April edition saw Melody Maker assemble a panel of readers to discuss the issues related to both cases.Then-editor Allan Jones placing the inspiration for the special nature of the issue firmly in the hands of the readers: "Every week the mailbag is just full of these letters. Richey's predicament seems to be emblematic of what a lot of people are going through." Jones saw the debate as focusing on the notion of whether "our rock stars are more vulnerable these days, and is that vulnerability a reflection of the vulnerability of their audience? And if so, why?"

On 21 April, Caitlin Moran, writing in The Times, commented that Edwards became "a cause celebre among depressives, alcoholics, anorexics, and self-mutilators, because he was the first person in the public eye to talk openly about these subjects, not with swaggering bravado and a subtext of 'look how tortured and cool I am', but with humility, sense and, often, bleak humour". Moran dismissed the mainstream media's narrative, which was geared towards the idea that Edwards inspired copycat actions in fans. With regard to  the 8 April edition of Melody Maker, Moran wrote of her distaste of the media treatment in general: "Arms were flung aloft and tongues tutted two weeks back, when the first anniversary of Kurt Cobain's suicide coincided with the two-month marking of ... Richey Edwards' disappearance, and Melody Maker instigated a debate on escalating teenage depression, self-mutilation and suicide." Nevertheless, Moran argued, "Cobain's actions and, to a greater extent, Richey Edwards's actions, have legitimised debate on these subjects".

Literature and other cultural influences 
As well as an interest in music, Edwards displayed a love for literature. He chose many of the quotes that appear on Manics record sleeves and would often refer to writers and poets during interviews. This interest in literature has remained integral to the band's music and lyrics. Albert Camus, Philip Larkin, Yukio Mishima, Fyodor Dostoyevsky and Arthur Rimbaud are known to have been among his favourite authors. In a dressing room interview, he also mentioned admiration for Primo Levi. Edwards' lyrics have often been of a highly poetic nature and at times they reflected his knowledge of political history.

Books about Edwards
In 2009, Rob Jovanovic's book A Version of Reason: The Search for Richey Edwards of the Manic Street Preachers was published. The book was written with the goal of providing an authoritative factual account, pieced together through testimonials from those close to Edwards before his disappearance. A novel by Ben Myers, entitled Richard: A Novel, was published on 1 October 2010 through Picador. Richard purports to be a fictionalised account of Edwards' life "as he might have told it." A 2015 novel by Guy Mankowski, entitled How I Left The National Grid, was heavily informed by Edwards and his disappearance. Howard Marks has also written a book about Edwards, Sympathy for the Devil, although his name has been changed to fictionalise the story.

In 2019, Sara Hawys Roberts and Leon Noakes published Withdrawn Traces: Searching for the Truth About Richey Manic, a book that claimed to provide fresh evidence that Edwards staged the disappearance. The book was published with consent from Edwards' sister, Rachel Edwards, who also wrote the foreword.

Discography and writing credits

With Manic Street Preachers

 Generation Terrorists (1992)
 Gold Against the Soul (1993)
 The Holy Bible (1994)
 Everything Must Go (1996)
 Journal for Plague Lovers (2009)

See also
Lists of people who disappeared
27 Club

Citations

References

External links

 Archives of Pain Richey Edwards fan site
 The Last of Richey Edwards?

1967 births
1990s missing person cases
1995 deaths
20th-century British guitarists
20th-century British male musicians
20th-century Welsh musicians
Alternative rock guitarists
Alumni of Swansea University
British alternative rock musicians
British lyricists
British socialists
Cool Cymru
Male guitarists
Manic Street Preachers members
Missing people
Missing person cases in Wales
People declared dead in absentia
People educated at Oakdale Comprehensive School
People from Blackwood, Caerphilly
People with mood disorders
Rhythm guitarists
Rock songwriters
Welsh rock guitarists
Welsh socialists
Welsh songwriters